The Regal Theatre is a theatre located in the suburb of Subiaco in Perth, Western Australia. It was built in 1937, and the official opening was on 27 April 1938.

The theatre was named for King George VI who, at the time it was being constructed, had taken up the throne. It was originally a theatre for films, but in 1977 the Regal was converted into a live theatre. It is one of the few remaining theatres in Perth.

Venue
The Regal Theatre is suited to all forms of theatre including stage shows, concerts, comedies, operas, film festivals and rock shows. The seating capacity is 1074 people.

Facilities
56 possible Fly Lines (32 Installed)
 orchestra pit
FOH camera
5 dressing rooms
2 chorus rooms
1 green room

Past performances
David Strassman
Beauty and the Beast
South Pacific
Hair
The Complete Works of Shakespeare
Stayin' Alive
Floorplay
Off Work
Robbee Williams Show
Respect
There have been many performances at the Regal Theatre, some are listed below
Joseph and the Amazing Technicolor Dreamcoat - Performed by Perth Youth Theatre
The Wizard Of Oz
Menopause the Musical
Art
Peter Pan
RENT07 (Rent)
Wakakirri 2002 Heats
The Phantom of the Opera
Oliver Twist

Further reading
 Dunn, Frank. (2004) Now and then - Brief history of the Regal Theatre. Sunday times (Perth, W.A.), 14 March 2004
 Geneve, Vyonne.(1998) The picture gardens of Western Australia. Trust news, Apr. 1998, p. 8-10
 Hocking Planning and Architecture.(2001) Regal Theatre, Subiaco : conservation plan Perth, W.A. Hocking Planning and Architecture.

References

External links

 Regal Theatre

Theatres in Perth, Western Australia
Streamline Moderne architecture in Australia
Art Deco architecture in Western Australia
Subiaco, Western Australia
Hay Street, Perth
1938 establishments in Australia
Theatres completed in 1938
State Register of Heritage Places in the City of Subiaco